Normal Sheeple is a 2021 book by Irish playwright and author Paul Howard and is the twenty-first novel in the Ross O'Carroll-Kelly series.

The title refers to the Sally Rooney novel Normal People and its TV adaptation, and to the phrase "sheeple", used to refer to people who show herd behaviour, but also perhaps referring to Kerry people as "sheep people."

Plot
Charles is Taoiseach, and Sorcha is appointed to his cabinet. Honor attends a Gaeltacht summer college, making her first rugby-playing boyfriend, and Ross takes up Gaelic football, playing for An Ghaeltacht GAA in County Kerry.

References

2021 Irish novels
Penguin Books books
Ross O'Carroll-Kelly
Fiction set in 2019
Fiction set in 2020
Gaelic games books